Petar Krumov (born 18 September 1941) is a Bulgarian wrestler. He competed in the men's Greco-Roman 87 kg at the 1968 Summer Olympics.

References

1941 births
Living people
Bulgarian male sport wrestlers
Olympic wrestlers of Bulgaria
Wrestlers at the 1968 Summer Olympics
Sportspeople from Sofia